Moretele is a town in Bojanala District Municipality in the North West province of South Africa.

Notable people
Zipporah Nawal member of parliament
 Prof Rita Maidi Raseleka (nee Mfolo)
 Gab Moitsiwa
 Dr George Shilaluke
 Thabo Monareng
 Thabo Moitsiwa
 Vincent Metlholo Mothabela
 Ikaneng Malebye

References

Populated places in the Moretele Local Municipality